The ISU Judging System (or the International Judging System (IJS)), occasionally referred to as the Code of Points (COP) system, is the scoring system that has been used since 2004 to judge the figure skating disciplines of men's and ladies' singles, pair skating, ice dance, and synchronized skating. It was designed and implemented by the International Skating Union (ISU), the ruling body of the sport. 

This system of scoring is used in all international competitions sanctioned by the ISU, including the Olympic Games. The ISU Judging System replaced the previous 6.0 system. It was created in part in response to the 2002 Winter Olympics figure skating scandal, in an attempt to make the scoring system more objective and less vulnerable to abuse.

Previous judging system

Figure skating was formerly judged on a 6.0 scale. This scale is sometimes called "the old scale", or "old system". Skaters were judged on "technical merit" (in the free skate), "required elements" (in the short program), and "presentation" (in both programs). The marks for each program ran from 0.0 to 6.0 and were used to determine a preference ranking, or "ordinal", separately for each judge; the judges' preferences were combined to determine placements for each skater in each program. The placements for the two programs were then combined, with the free skate weighted more heavily than the short program.
The highest scoring individual (based on the sum of the weighted placements) was declared the winner.

Scandal and response

There was a judging controversy during the 2002 Winter Olympics for pair skating, with scoring at the time based on the 6.0 system. A second award ceremony was held in which the top two teams were both awarded gold medals. In 2004, the ISU adopted the New Judging System (NJS), or Code of Points, in an effort to establish a more objective system. This became mandatory at all international competitions in 2006, including the 2006 Winter Olympics.

Technical details

Technical panel
Under the ISU Judging System, the base value of each element performed by the skater is identified by the Technical Panel. The purpose of this panel is to identify all of the elements performed by the skater in real time as they happen.  The panel is also responsible for identifying any "technical errors" to jumps; identifying falls of the skater; and the "levels of difficulty" performed in Spins and Steps.

The Technical Panel is composed of the following five people:
 The Technical Specialist (TS), who verbally calls the elements as they happen.
 The Assistant Technical Specialist (ATS), who takes written notes on all of the elements performed and to contribute to any decisions on technical calls during the "review of elements".
 The Technical Controller (TC), who supervises the panel, and breaks ties on technical decisions during the "review of elements" when the TS and ATS do not agree. The TC is also responsible for "rule vetting" the program. The TC can discard any elements from scoring that break the rules for that level and specific program.
 The Data Operator (DO) inputs the codes of the elements and levels of difficulty into the computer system.  The DO also flags elements called "for review". In the U.S. the DO also replays the video clips of the elements during the review process. The DO is available to assist the TC in the process of "rule vetting", in the event that the TC is unsure or makes a mistake.
 The Video Replay Operator (VRO) marks clips of elements for review. This person replays the clips in place of the DO in international competitions. But in the U.S., this person is not involved in the review process.

Judging panel
The judging panel's primary purpose is to grade the quality of each individual technical element performed by the skater, known as the Grade of Execution (GOE), and the five Program Component Scores (PCS) for each segment of the competition. The five component scores replaced the "presentation mark" in the old 6.0 system. At most international events and other large National Championships (such as the U.S. Championships), there are nine judges. At smaller competitions the panel might consist of between four and seven judges. An odd number of judges was needed to break ties in the old 6.0 system, but this is no longer necessary with averaging marks in the ISU Judging System.

Grade of Execution (GOE)
The evaluation of the Grade of Execution (GOE) for each technical element has clear guidelines from the ISU; it ranges from a "base value" of 0, to as high as +5 and as low as –5. In order to award a positive GOE, a judge needs to identify a certain number of "positive bullets" with almost no reductions. One positive bullet is needed for a GOE of +1, two bullets for a +2, three for a +3, four for a +4, and five or more for a GOE of +5. In the case of a negative GOE, a judge must be able to support their evaluation with reference to the published list of reductions. As the skater performs each element, the judges evaluate all phases of the element, possibly weighing both positive and negative aspects of the element in order to determine a final GOE. Prior to the 2018–19 season, which started on 1 July 2018, the GOE scoring system ranged from –3 to +3, with a base value of 0. The changes were implemented to allow more accurate scoring factors to be awarded in a sport that is becoming increasingly technical.

To aid the process of evaluating only the quality of an element, while ignoring the difficulty of the element, the judges are simply shown the element codes on their screens; they do not see the levels of difficulty awarded by the Technical Panel. The judges must be able to support every mark that they have awarded in case they are questioned by the referee after the event.

Program Component Scores (PCS)

The five program component scores are Skating skills, Transitions, Performance, Composition, and Interpretation. Each mark has individual characteristics that are evaluated; they are scored from 0.25 to 10.00 in quarter-point increments. The scale from zero to ten is an absolute scale, so for example if 6.00 is considered "above average" then each judge’s understanding of a 6.00 should remain the same throughout an event and their judging careers.

 Skating skills: This mark assesses the skater's command of the blade over the ice, including the ability to skate with power and ease, forwards and backwards, clockwise and counter-clockwise. How acute is the skater's blade to the ice? How clean and clear are the curves over the ice (known as edge quality)? Skating skills are considered to be excellent if the skater moves quickly and easily, and flows over the ice with soft knees and ankles; but they are judged to be poor if the skating is scratchy and noisy, with the skater pushing from their toes rather than from the sides of the blades.
 Transitions: This mark evaluates all of the "in between" skating when technical elements are not being performed, i.e. whether the skater is merely skating in circles, or incorporating different turns and steps, perhaps also using their arms. A program with good transitions manages to "thread" all the elements together, making the skater's program seem effortless. Poor transitions are sometimes non-existent or merely places between the technical elements with a precise "stopping" point where the skater begins to prepare for the next element.
 Performance: This is where the scores start to become slightly more abstract and largely based on the judges' individual opinions. Is the skater physically, emotionally, and mentally involved in their program? Does the skater project to the entire audience and arena? Does the skater have presence on the ice with good carriage? Do they project their own personality while skating?
 Composition: This mark is concerned with the pattern and spacing over the ice, i.e. how the technical elements are placed throughout the ice surface. Does the skater always skate in the same part of the ice or are they making use of the entire area given to them? Is there a purpose to the way the program is constructed? Maybe their performance is designed to convey an abstract idea like rain or snow; or it might be about a particular story, e.g. when performing to a movie soundtrack or ballet. Does the movement in the program match the phrasing of the music? Perhaps there is meant to be a traditional musical "call and answer" or something more abstract.
 Interpretation: This score reflects how well the judges feel that the skater is performing with their "soul" (whereas the Composition score is more about the choreography). Does the skater move in time to the music, or are all the movements just off by a beat or two? Does the skater reflect every little trill and ding with a corresponding skating move?

Computation of scores 

The judging panel consists of up to nine judges and one referee. The Technical Panel sends the element codes to the judges' computers for marking. For each element, all of the judges award a mark for Grade of Execution (GOE) that is an integer between –5 and +5. The GOE mark is then translated into a value using the Scale of Value (SOV) table which is published regularly by ISU Communications. The GOE values from the nine judges are averaged using the "trimmed mean" procedure, where the highest and lowest values are discarded and an average is calculated from the remaining seven values. This average value (which may be positive or negative) is finally added to the base value to produce the judging panel's overall score for the element.

Judges also mark the Program Components, which are: Skating Skills; Transitions/Linking Footwork; Performance and Execution; Composition and Choreography; and Interpretation and Timing. These Components are marked on a scale of 0.25–10 with 0.25 increments and averaged using the same "trimmed mean" procedure that was used for averaging the GOE marks. Judges also have the power to input majority deductions such as Music Violations and Costume/Prop Violations. The Referee inputs other deductions such as Time Violations, Interruption in Excess and Costume Failures.

Technical elements
The number and type of technical elements included in a skating program depend on the event and on the level of competition. At the senior international level, the short program for both singles and pair skaters must contain seven technical elements. The free program must contain twelve elements for singles and eleven elements for pairs.

Details of the seven elements required of singles skaters in their short program are given in ISU rule 611: the skater must attempt two solo jumps, one combination jump, three spins (including one combination spin and one flying spin), and one step sequence. The seven elements required of pair skaters in their short program are detailed in ISU rule 620; the pair must attempt two lifts, one side-by-side jump, one throw jump, one spin combination, one death spiral, and one step sequence.

The twelve elements required of singles skaters in their free program are detailed in ISU rule 612; the skater must perform seven jumps, three spins (including one combination spin and one flying spin), one step sequence, and one choreographic sequence (formerly the "choreographic step sequence" for Men and the "spiral sequence" for Ladies). The eleven elements required of pair skaters in their free program are detailed in ISU rule 621; they must attempt a maximum of four lifts (including one twist lift), four jumps (including two different throw jumps), one pair spin combination, one death spiral, and one choreographic sequence (previously known as the "spiral sequence").

Component factoring
The panel's points for each Program Component are multiplied by a factor depending on the event. For singles and pair skating, the factor is uniform for all components, as follows:

The factors in ice dance are different for each Program Component and depend on the dance type.

Protocol details
Following an event, the complete judges' scores are published in a document referred to as a protocol. This document uses specific notations as described below.

If a skater attempts more than the allowed number of a certain type of element in a program, then the element is still described and called as such by the technical controller, but receives a base value of 0 as well as a GOE of 0, regardless of how the judges have marked it. On ISU protocol sheets, elements that have been nullified by this are denoted by an asterisk (*) next to the element name. In free skating, for jumps executed twice as solo jumps, the second jump is marked as +REP and receives 70% of its base value. Jump elements performed after the halfway point of a program are marked with x and receive a 10% bonus added to their base value. If a jump has been called as having an unclear take-off edge, that jump is marked with ! and receives a –1 to –2 GOE depending on severity; if a jump has been called as having an incorrect take-off edge (for example, an inside edge on the take-off of a Lutz jump), that jump is marked with e and receives a –2 or –3 GOE depending on the severity of the edge fault. Jumps that are under-rotated are marked with < or << depending on the degree of turns completed on the ice instead of in mid-air. < indicates that a jump had less than a ½ turn but more than a ¼ turn completed on the ice, reducing the base value to 70% of its original value. << indicates a severe under-rotation (a ½ turn or more) and the jump is valued as if it had one less rotation (e.g. a triple would receive the value of a double).

Jumps that are executed in combination or sequence are marked as a single element, with a base mark equal to the sum of the base marks for the individual jumps. However, a combination or sequence can be downgraded – marked with +COMBO (combinations in the short program) or +SEQ (combinations and sequences in the free skate) – in which case the sum of the base values of the jumps is reduced to 80% of its original value.

Scale of Values (SOV) and abbreviations of common elements
Every spring/summer the ISU releases rule updates which include a current Scale of Values (SOV) for different types of element. One is released for Singles/Pairs and another for Ice Dance. 

The level of a spin or footwork sequence is denoted by the number following the element abbreviation. The number of rotations on a jump is denoted by the number preceding the element abbreviation. For example, 3A denotes a triple Axel, while SlSt4 denotes a level four straight line step sequence. ChSt and ChSq are step sequences and spiral sequences that have no level and a fixed base value.

In ice dance
Ice dance judging is similar to pairs and singles, but uses a separate set of rules and table of values. In the compulsory dance, steps are specified and "elements" are defined for each dance as subsets of the prescribed steps. For compulsory dance only, there is no program component score given for transitions and choreography. Instead there is a timing (TI) program component that is exclusive to the compulsory dance, leaving only four program components in the compulsory dance. In the original dance there are five marked technical elements. In the free dance, there are nine marked technical elements. Unlike singles and pair skating, the different program components are weighted differently in each segment of the competition. The highest factored component(s) in each segment are skating skills and timing in the compulsory dance, interpretation in the original dance, and transitions in the free dance. The exact values of these factors are listed in ISU Rule 543.1k.

High scores 

After being trialed in 2003, the IJS replaced the old 6.0 system in the 2004–2005 figure skating season. Up to and including the 2017–2018 season, the Grade of Execution (GOE) scoring system for each program element ranged between –3 and +3. Starting with the 2018–2019 season, the GOE was expanded to range between –5 and +5. Hence, the International Skating Union (ISU) have restarted all records from the 2018–2019 season and all previous statistics have been marked as "historical".

The ISU only recognizes the best scores that are set at international competitions run under the ISU's rules, and does not recognize, for example, scores that are obtained at national figure skating championships. The competitions recognized by the ISU are: Winter Olympics (including the team event), Youth Olympics (including the team event), World Championships, World Junior Championships, European Championships, Four Continents Championships, GP events, Junior GP events, Challenger Series events, and World Team Trophy.

List of highest scores in figure skating 

Records: current record holders; technical and component record scores; progression of record scores
Personal bests: highest personal best scores; highest PB technical element scores; highest PB program component scores
Absolute bests: lists of absolute best scores

For highest scores achieved prior to the 2018–2019 season, see List of highest historical scores in figure skating.

List of highest junior scores in figure skating 

Records: current junior record holders; technical and component record scores; progression of junior record scores
Personal bests: highest personal best scores; highest PB technical element scores; highest PB program component scores
Absolute bests: lists of absolute best scores

For highest junior scores prior to the 2018–2019 season, see List of highest historical junior scores in figure skating.

Subjectivity
Like gymnastics and diving competitions, judging in figure skating is intrinsically subjective. Although there may be general consensus that one skater "looks better" than another, it is difficult to reach agreement on what causes one skater to be marked as 5.5 and another to be 5.75 for a particular program component. As judges, coaches, and skaters gain more experience with the new system, greater consensus may emerge. However, for the 2006 Olympics there were cases of 1 to 1.5 point differences in component marks from different judges. This range of difference implies that "observer bias" determines about 20% of the mark given by a judge. Averaging over many judges reduces the effect of this bias in the final score, but there will remain about a 2% spread in the average artistic marks from the randomly selected subsets of judges.

Aside from intra-expert subjectivity, skating is very open to misjudgement from everyday spectators who only see skating casually, e.g. every four years at the Olympics. A skater's jump may look perfect, but the general public will not be aware that the competitor landed on an incorrect edge, therefore receiving fewer points for an element, resulting in the appearance of haphazard or biased judging.

Criticism
The aim of the IJS is to ensure that the judging of figure skating competitions is more consistent with the judging of sports such as diving and gymnastics. It also includes features intended to make judging more resistant to pressure by special interests. However, there is debate as to whether the new system is in fact an improvement over the old 6.0 system. One criticism of the adoption of the IJS was in the way it alienated casual figure skating fans; whereas the 6.0 system was universally understood due to its simplicity and intuitive scale, the large cumulative scores given by the IJS are less intuitive. Judging bias was also found to be about 20 percent greater in the IJS than in the 6.0 system, with judges being inclined to give higher marks to skaters from their own country. 

Initially under the new ISU rules, the judges' marks were anonymous, which removed any public accountability of the judges for their marks. However, problems with this system came to the forefront during the Sochi Olympics in 2014 following Russian skater Adelina Sotnikova's victory over Yuna Kim. In large part due to the judging and technical panels including four Russians, these results sparked a debate over the judges' objectivity. In June 2016 the ISU Congress voted to abolish anonymous judging altogether.

Ties
While the IJS has minimized the number of ties and the need for multiple tiebreaks, as there were under the old 6.0 system, ties do still occur for both overall score and also for single segments of the competition. Short/rhythm segment ties are broken based on the TES score and free segment ties on the PCS. For ties in the overall score, ties are broken based on the free segment placement.

Judge reduction in 2008
In 2008, the ISU ruled to reduce the number of judges from twelve to nine. The need to reduce costs was given as the prime reason for this change. Since the highest and lowest extreme scores are discounted, the scores of seven judges (rather than ten) determine the outcome of competitions.

References

External links
ISU Judging System technical documents
ISU Judging System news
Summary of ISU Judging System (2013 archive)
U.S. Figure Skating Technical Info: "International Judging System (IJS)" (2016 archive)
U.S. Figure Skating Scoring Guide: "Understanding the International Judging System"
U.S. Figure Skating Scoring System: IJS vs. 6.0 system

Figure skating
Figure skating